Uzma Khan (born 28 February 1987) is a Pakistani film actress.  She started her career with the movie The Dusk (2011) and later appeared in the film Waar (2013) and Yalghaar (2015). She played the role of the character Mujtuba's wife in Waar.

Controversy 

On 28 May 2020, a video of Khan was leaked where she was seen physically assaulted by Amna Malik, Amber Malik and Pashmina Malik. The reports for this assault was over retaliation of her extra marital affair with the husband of Amna Malik named Usman Malik. Amber Malik and Pashmina Malik who are the daughters of Pakistan's real estate developer Malik Riaz, and their guards stormed into Khan's house,  harassed Khan along with beating her and throwing decorative items made of glass at Khan and her sister.

The leaked viral video revealed Malik Riaz daughter entered the house of actress Uzma khan with her guards and sexually threatened her, In addition, the woman is heard instigating the guards that came with her to 'touch' Khan, in a way inciting sexual violence against her.

The incident was heavily criticized by netizens and prominent media personalities and justice for Uzma Khan started trending on twitter. FIR against Amna Malik, Amber Malik and Pashmina Malik has been registered. On 3 June 2020, Malik Riaz father of Amna Malik sues Uzma Khan for 5 billion rupees for defaming him over scandal. 

On 2 June 2020, the news sparked on Social Media that Uzma Khan withdrew the case. Her lawyer Khadija disassociate herself from Uzma's case after she told BBC about settlement between both parties. The sister of Huma Khan confirmed this news that we are taking the case (FIR) back and Amna Malik didn't harm us and it was a case of misunderstanding, a copy of legal statement of Huma Khan has been published in news.

Filmography

Television 
 Adhi Gawahi (2017) as Soha
 Kaisi Aurat Hoon Main (2018) as Sara Hamdan

References

External links 
 

1987 births
Living people
Pakistani female models
Pakistani television actresses
21st-century Pakistani actresses
Pakistani film actresses
People from Karachi